The Prix littéraire des Caraïbes (Caribbean Literary Prize) is a French literary award which was created in 1964 by l’Association des Écrivains de langue française (Association of French language writers).   The award honors a writer from one of the French Caribbean islands (Haiti, Martinique, Guadeloupe, French Guiana) for an imaginative and elegant prose. The Prize is given every two years during a ceremony held at the French Senate, in Paris.

The Prize winners

References

Sources
The French section of Wikipedia for Prix littéraire des Caraïbes and Le Grand Prix de l'Afrique noire.

Caraibes, Prix litteraire des
Awards established in 1964
Caribbean literary awards
Haitian literature
Martiniquais literature
Guadeloupean literature
French Guianan literature